A sanding block is a block used to hold sandpaper. In its simplest form, it is a block of wood or cork with one smooth flat side. The user wraps the sandpaper around the block, and holds it in place (by inserting a fitted piece of cardboard under the sandpaper, one can soften the impact on the wood and protect against tears or uneven wear on the sandpaper).

Fancier versions use clips, teeth or clamps to hold the paper in place. Commercial versions can be constructed of various materials. They are usually sized to hold a quarter or half sheet of sandpaper. Some versions use the sandpaper belts intended for a power belt sander. Construction workers often use commercial one-piece sanding blocks consisting of a foam plastic block with an abrasive coating.

References

Woodworking hand tools